The Mutisioideae are a subfamily in the plant family Asteraceae that includes about 630 species assigned to 44 different genera. This subfamily is mainly native in South America, except for Adenocaulon, Chaptalia, Gerbera, Trichocline, which have species in all continents other than Europe and Antarctica. Common characters are the deeply incised corollas of the disc florets, with five
lobes, sometimes merged in two lips, flower heads with overlapping involucral bracts, anthers with tails and pointy tips, the styles usually stick far out of the florets and are essentially hairless. Most species are herbs, but some are vines, shrubs, or small trees.

Taxonomy
The subfamily Mutisioideae consists of three tribes:

Tribe Mutisieae

 Adenocaulon Hook. (five species)
 Brachyclados Gillies ex D.Don (three spp.)
 Chaetanthera Ruiz & Pav. (47 spp.)
 Chaptalia Vent. (69 spp.)
 Eriachaenium Sch.Bip (one sp.)
 Gerbera  L. (40 spp.)
 Leibnitzia Cass. (eight spp.)
 Lulia Zardini (one sp.)
 Mutisia L.f. (58 spp.)
 Oreoseris DC. (12 spp.)
 Pachylaena D.Don ex Hook. (two spp.)
 Perdicium L. (two spp.)
 Trichocline Cass. (24 spp.)

Tribe Onoserideae

Aphyllocladus Wedd.
Gypothamnium Phil. (one sp.)
Lycoseris Cass.
Onoseris Willd.
Plazia Ruiz & Pav
Paquirea Panero, J. & S. E. Freire. (1 sp.)
Urmenetea Phil.

Tribe Nassauvieae

 Acourtia D.Don (65 spp.)
 Ameghinoa Speg.
 Berylsimpsonia B. L. Turner
 Burkartia Crisci (one sp.)
 Calopappus Meyen
 Calorezia Panero
 Cephalopappus Nees & Mart.
 Criscia Katinas (one sp.)
 Dolichlasium Lag.
 Holocheilus Cass. (seven spp.)
 Jungia L. f.
 Leucheria Lag.
 Leunisia Phil.
 Lophopappus Rusby
 Macrachaenium Hook f. (one sp.)
 Marticorenia Crisci (one sp.)
 Moscharia Ruiz & Pav.
 Nassauvia Comm. ex Juss.
 Oxyphyllum Phil.
 Pamphalea Lag. (9 spp.)
 Perezia Lag.
 Pleocarphus D.Don: (one sp.)
 Polyachyrus Lag.
 Proustia Lag.
 Triptilion Ruiz & Pav.
 Trixis P.Br. (50 spp.)

Some species

References

External links

 
Asterales subfamilies